Arikha is a Hebrew surname. Notable people with the surname include:

Abba Arikha (175–247 CE), Jewish amora
Alba Arikha (born 1966), French-British writer, daughter of Avigdor
Avigdor Arikha (1928–2010), French-Israeli artist, father of Alba

Hebrew-language surnames